Rajwadi is a village found in Maharashtra, India.

Villages in Ratnagiri district